Ali Sami Yen Sports Complex or Ali Sami Yen Spor Kompleksi is a multi-purpose sports complex in the Şişli district of Istanbul, Turkey. It is owned by Galatasaray SK.

Construction

Phase 1

The home ground of Galatasaray is the Nef Stadium in the Aslantepe quarter near Maslak financial district in Şişli. The stadium, which was opened on January 15, 2011, has a capacity of 52,223 seats, making it the largest private stadium owned by a club in Turkey.

Phase 2
Galatasaray Store & Entertainment Center was opened on February 7, 2012. The first floor is dedicated to Galatasaray Store with the help of Nike. The second floor consists of Ülker Fan Zone, Sony PlayStation, Galatasaray HDI Insurance, GS Bilyoner and Magic Pictures  areas.

Phase 3
Galatasaray 16,000+ seated indoor arena  & Galatasaray Congress Center (1,500 seated)

Phase 4
Galatasaray Museum & Galatasaray Cultural Center

Phase 5
Galatasaray Medical Park Hospital

References

Football venues in Turkey
Galatasaray S.K. facilities
Multi-purpose stadiums in Turkey
High-tech architecture
Sport in Şişli
Proposed indoor arenas
Proposed buildings and structures in Turkey